Tord Hall (7 January 1910 - 30 September 1987) was a Swedish mathematician, university professor and bestselling author.

Life 

He was born in 1910 in Jönköping, Sweden, and died in 1987.

Career 

He completed his Ph.D. in mathematics from Uppsala University. His PhD advisor was Arne Beurling. The title of his PhD thesis was On Polynomials bounded at an Infinity of Points.

From 1959 to 1975, he was a professor of mathematics at Uppsala University. He published several mathematical theorems.

In addition to his academic career, he also worked as an employee for newspaper Svenska Dagbladet and Sveriges Radio, the national Swedish radio.

Bibliography 

He is most well known as the biographer of Carl Gauss (Biography of Carl Gauss).
It was translated into English by Albert Froderberg.

The book generally received favorable reviews.

References

External links 

 
 
 

1910 births
1987 deaths
Uppsala University alumni
Academic staff of Uppsala University
People from Jönköping
20th-century Swedish  mathematicians
Burials at Uppsala old cemetery